Hoo Male  is an Indian Kannada television drama that premiered on Colors Kannada on 16 November 2020. The show is official remake of Hindi TV Serial Choti Sarrdaarni. The show ended on 16 October 2021 after airing 254 episodes.

Plot 
Carefree and bubbly, Lahari falls in love with Mukund, who runs a local restaurant. Lahari becomes pregnant with his child. Lahari's mother, Corporator Kaveri, learns of Lahari's pregnancy and relationship with Mukund. She refuses to accept Mukund as he is financially unstable. Kaveri invites him to her house and stabs him, and tries to kill her unborn child. She wants Lahari to marry a widower, Yaduveer, who is the president of the ruling party in Bangalore. Yaduveer has a 5-year-old son, Ishan". Kaveri forces Lahari to marry Yaduveer because she wants to become an MLA. At first, Lahari refuses the marriage proposal but later agrees to save her unborn child from Kaveri's ill intentions.

On their wedding night, she reveals her pregnancy to Yaduveer and pleads him to let her go as she wants to settle far away and bring up her child. Yaduveer gets angry but later promises to have her settled in Tamil Nadu. However, Yaduveer, Lahari and Ishan visit Tamil Nadu with a new identity. But, Yaduveer is accused of killing Lahari and is arrested and taken to Karnataka. Lahari is kidnapped by goons and discovers what happened to Yaduveer. She escapes from there and rescues Yaduveer from the false accusation with the help of her eldest brother, Uday. Yaduveer accepts her child as his own. Yaduveer and Lahari tell Ishan about her pregnancy. Excited, Ishan reveals this to everyone. A grand party is organized to celebrate Lahari's pregnancy news. Soon, Yaduveer's sister, Ambika finds out that the baby is not Yaduveer's and blames Lahari. Her behaviour towards Lahari changes after that.

Cast 
 Chandana Ananthakrishna as Lahari – Kaveri's daughter; Mukund's ex-fiancée; Yaduveer's wife; Ishaan's step-mother
 Yeaswanth as Yaduveer – Ambika's brother; Lahari's husband; Ishaan's father
 Vikas Gowda as Mukund – Lahari's ex-fiancé
 Sujatha Akshaya as Corporator Kaveri – Lahari's mother
 Dheeru as Ishaan – Yaduveer's son; Lahari's step-son
 Arohi Naina as Ambika – Yaduveer's sister

References 

2020 Indian television series debuts
Kannada-language television shows
2021 Indian television series endings
Colors Kannada original programming